Allen Mountain is located in the Lewis Range, Glacier National Park in the U.S. state of Montana.
Allen Mountain is NNW of Cracker Lake.  The mountain is named to honor Cornelia Seward Allen, the granddaughter of President Abraham Lincoln's Secretary of State William H. Seward Sr. The mountain was named in 1891 by a party of explorers headed by George Bird Grinnell that included Cornelia's brother, William Henry Seward III, a Yale University classmate of Grinnell.

See also
 List of mountains and mountain ranges of Glacier National Park (U.S.)

Gallery

References

Mountains of Glacier County, Montana
Mountains of Glacier National Park (U.S.)
Lewis Range
Mountains of Montana